Aristotelia pulicella is a moth of the family Gelechiidae. It was described by Walsingham in 1897. It is found in West Indies, where it has been recorded from St. Thomas.

The wingspan is about 7 mm. The forewings are whitish grey, shaded with greyish fuscous, especially along the costal third. This is interrupted on the costa by a pale median space and some pale speckling before the apex. Some minute blackish dots are scattered along the line of the fold, with one on the disc before the middle and a few black scales beneath the apex at the base of the yellowish-grey cilia. The hindwings are brownish grey.

References

Moths described in 1897
Aristotelia (moth)
Moths of the Caribbean